Holmia (minor planet designation: 378 Holmia) is a typical Main belt asteroid.

It was discovered by Auguste Charlois on 6 December 1893, in Nice. The name comes from the Holmia, the Latin name for Stockholm, Sweden.

References

External links
 
 

Background asteroids
Holmia
Holmia
S-type asteroids (Tholen)
S-type asteroids (SMASS)
18931206